Schwenningen (Neckar) station is one of two stations in Villingen-Schwenningen in the German state of Baden-Württemberg. The other is Villingen (Schwarzwald). Schwenningen owes its connection to the railway to Johannes Bürk, who had demanded a route through Schwenningen to promote the local watch industry, which included his own factory. The original plans involved a route through Niedereschach. The station is located at the Neckar, south of central Schwenningen. The complex included a station building and a goods shed.

The station promoted the economic boom of Schwenningen as an industrial city. The watch industry attracted workers from far away, some from the Stuttgart area. That explains why 436,410 passengers were counted in 1907, as Schwenningen had developed from the village into a city by that time.

History
The station building was completed in 1872.

As a result of the industrial importance of Schwenningen, the station was repeatedly targeted by Allied air raids during World War II.

A goods yard was once located on the opposite side of the tracks, but west of the entrance buildings. After the remediation of the area and the defusing of the last known unexploded ordnance, the venue was used for the Villingen-Schwenningen state garden show (Landesgartenschau) in 2010.

The station includes a historic signal box, which was built in 1869. This allowed the route to be set by means of mechanical levers. It is located opposite the entrance building near the Neckar. The building is no longer used for railway operations, but is heritage-listed. During the garden show, the pedestrian underpass that once connected the entrance building with Neckarstraße was shortened. It now extends only to the rear of the second platform and the signal box, which was secured with a new base.

References

Sources

External links
 (dissertation)

Railway stations in Germany opened in 1869
Buildings and structures in Schwarzwald-Baar-Kreis
Railway stations in Baden-Württemberg
19th-century establishments in Württemberg
Villingen-Schwenningen